Aaliyah Prince (born 5 February 2001) is a Trinidadian footballer who plays as a midfielder for American college Northeast Texas Eagles and the Trinidad and Tobago women's national team.

International career
Prince represented Trinidad and Tobago at the 2016 CONCACAF Girls' U-15 Championship and two CONCACAF Women's U-20 Championship editions (2018 and 2020). At senior level, she played the 2018 CFU Women's Challenge Series, the 2018 CONCACAF Women's Championship qualification and the 2020 CONCACAF Women's Olympic Qualifying Championship qualification.

International goals
Scores and results list Trinidad and Tobago' goal tally first.

References

External links

2001 births
Living people
Women's association football forwards
Women's association football midfielders
Trinidad and Tobago women's footballers
People from Morvant
Trinidad and Tobago women's international footballers
Competitors at the 2018 Central American and Caribbean Games
College women's soccer players in the United States
Trinidad and Tobago expatriate women's footballers
Trinidad and Tobago expatriate sportspeople in the United States
Expatriate women's soccer players in the United States
Trinidad and Tobago women's futsal players
Futsal players at the 2018 Summer Youth Olympics
Northeast Texas Community College
21st-century American women